A list of the films produced in Mexico in 1985 (see 1985 in film):

1985

External links

1985
Films
Lists of 1985 films by country or language